Alejo Santos Santos (born Alejo de los Santos de los Santos; July 17, 1911 – February 18, 1984) was a Filipino soldier and World War II hero who parlayed his fame into a political career. His prestige was somewhat marred in later life when he agreed to run as the only major candidate opposing Ferdinand Marcos in the 1981 Philippine presidential election.

Early life and public service

Santos was born in Barangay Bonga Menor, Bustos, Bulacan, to farmer Pedro de los Santos y de la Cruz and Regina de los Santos y Francisco. He graduated from the University of the Philippines with an education degree. He first served as Prison Guard with the Bureau of Prisons from 1933 to 1934. Santos married Juanita Garcia of Baliuag, Bulacan in 1934 and they had eight children: Reynaldo, Edgardo, Ravenal, Lamberto, Alexis, Liberty, Daisy, and Nenita. At the outbreak of World War II, he was a captain of the USAFFE. He was among the USAFFE soldiers who retreated to Bataan to make the last stand against the invading Imperial Japanese Army. However, he evaded capture by the Japanese when Bataan fell, escaping instead to his hometown. Santos then agreed to join the fledgling anti-Japanese guerrilla warfare movement under Bernard L. Anderson. He became one of the founders of the Bulacan Military Area, the main guerrilla movement in Bulacan which had 23,000 men under its command. The BMA attracted many patriotic Filipinos chafing under Japanese rule, and was soon organized into eight divisions. For his World War II activities, Santos received numerous citations and awards from the Philippine and American governments.

He was the only Filipino conferred the rank of brigadier general by the American Government.

Political career

After the liberation of Bulacan by joint Filipino and American ground troops in 1945, Santos was named as its military governor. He was elected as to the House of Representatives in 1946, representing the 2nd District of Bulacan under the banner of the leftist Democratic Alliance, but was almost immediately unseated together with several of his party-mates in a controversial maneuver believed to be related with the looming congressional vote on the approval of the Bell Trade Act with the United States. Nonetheless, Santos was again elected to the House in 1949, and he served in the 2nd Congress until his election as governor of Bulacan in 1951. By then, Santos had affiliated with the Nacionalista Party. Santos would serve as governor until 1957, wherein 705 public works projects were constructed in Bulacan and the national government released  for these. From 1959 to 1961, Santos served as Secretary of National Defense in the cabinet of President Carlos P. Garcia. In 1967, he was appointed by President Marcos to head the prison bureau, a post he held until 1971.

Presidential candidacy

By 1981, Santos had mostly retired from political life, devoting his activity to veterans affairs; thus, it came as a surprise when he agreed to run for President against Ferdinand Marcos in the 1981 elections. The elections were called shortly after Marcos lifted the nine-year-old declaration of martial law while retaining authoritarian powers at the same time, and were seen as a means of maintaining the veneer of democracy, especially in the international community. However, the anti-Marcos political opposition, which felt it was cheated out of victory in the 1978 parliamentary elections, refused to participate in the presidential elections and successfully called for a boycott. Santos' candidacy, ostensibly under the banner of the then-moribund Nacionalista Party, provided Marcos with at least one other "major" candidate he could run against. Santos, though the sole widely known opponent of Marcos, did not offer a vigorous campaign, and he was trounced in the election, garnering only 8% of the vote as against Marcos's 88%.

Death

Santos died just three years after his presidential candidacy and was buried at the Libingan ng mga Bayani. Later on, his remains were transferred into a memorial park in his hometown in Bulacan. A camp of the Philippine National Police in Bulacan is named after Santos.

Notes

References

Bibliography
Filipinos in History: Volume IV, National Historical Institute (Manila, 1994)

1911 births
1984 deaths
Filipino generals
People from Bulacan
Candidates in the 1981 Philippine presidential election
Governors of Bulacan
Philippine Army personnel of World War II
Paramilitary Filipinos
Nacionalista Party politicians
Secretaries of National Defense of the Philippines
Members of the House of Representatives of the Philippines from Bulacan
Burials at the Libingan ng mga Bayani
Garcia administration cabinet members
University of Manila alumni